The Legend of Hercules is a 2014 American 3D action fantasy film directed by Renny Harlin, written by Daniel Giat and Sean Hood, and starring Kellan Lutz, Gaia Weiss, Scott Adkins, Roxanne McKee, and Liam Garrigan. It was distributed by Lionsgate and released January 10, 2014, six months before another Hollywood-studio Hercules film, Paramount Pictures' and MGM's co-production Hercules. The Legend of Hercules was a box-office bomb and received universally negative reviews, unlike Hercules, which was a financial success and opened to far stronger reviews.

Plot 
In 1200 BC ancient Greece, King Amphitryon of Tiryns is conquering kingdoms in his thirst for more power, which disgusts his wife, Queen Alcmene. She prays to Hera for guidance, and Hera's husband Zeus impregnates Alcmene with the savior of her people, a demi-god son to be named Hercules. Amphitryon names his new "son" Alcides, though Alcmene secretly acknowledges his true name as Hercules. Twenty years later, Prince Alcides (Hercules) is the lover of Princess Hebe of Crete. Hercules and his older brother, Prince Iphicles, are attacked by a unusually strong Nemean lion, which Hercules strangles to death. Iphicles takes the credit at a royal banquet, but Hebe sees right through this lie. At the banquet Amphitryon announces the engagement of Hebe and Iphicles, while Hercules is sent away to a military campaign in Egypt. Alcmene tells him of his true lineage and that his name is Hercules, not Alcides.

Hercules joins the command of Captain Sotiris in the Egyptian desert; their small company faces an ambush by Amphitryon meant to eliminate Hercules, and only Alcides and Sotiris survive. Hercules uses his gods-given name to conceal his identity as the prince. The two are sold off as slaves to Lucius, a promoter of gladiator style fights, where they excel. Hercules defeats six previously-undefeated gladiators in an arena battle in Greece, which motivates members of Amphitryon's army to desert it and join Hercules and Sotiris, beginning a fight against Amphitryon's campaign of tyranny. Amphitryon is forced to hire foreign mercenaries as a result.

When Alcides does not return as promised, Alcmene and Hebe assume he is dead. When Alcmene seeks guidance from Hera, Amphitryon discovers her and learns the truth of Hercules' parentage and that he is fated to overthrow him. Amphitryon stabs Alcmene with her own dagger, which he hides as a suicide. Iphicles threatens Sotiris' son, forcing Sotiris to lead him to Hercules. Iphicles is surprised to discover that Hercules is Alcides. Hercules is chained and publicly flogged, then watches in horror as Iphicles murders Chiron, Alcmene's loyal adviser, under Amphitryon's orders. In anguish he acknowledges Zeus as his father and calls upon him for strength. Hercules breaks free from his chains and kills Amphitryon's guard, though Amphitryon and Iphicles escape.

Hercules and Sotiris raise an army and storm Amphitryon's palace. Amphitryon's palace guard join Hercules and his army and they battle Amphitryon's mercenaries. Hercules calls upon his father who infuses his sword with the power of lightning. Hercules defeats the mercenaries with his lightning sword, then meets Amphitryon in personal combat. Hercules nearly defeats Amphitryon but Iphicles holds Hebe hostage and threatens to kill her if Hercules does not let Amphitryon go. Hercules hesitates but Hebe thrusts the dagger through his shoulder, killing Iphicles. Hercules finally avenges Alcmene's death and kills Amphitryon with the same blade that killed his mother. Hercules rushes to Hebe's side as she slowly drifts into unconsciousness. Nearly a year later, the cries of a baby are heard, Hercules' and Hebe's son. That night, he watches over his kingdom, finally fulfilling his destiny.

Cast

 Kellan Lutz as Hercules (Alcides)
 Gaia Weiss as Hebe
 Scott Adkins as King Amphitryon
 Roxanne McKee as Queen Alcmene
 Liam Garrigan as Iphicles
 Liam McIntyre as Sotiris
 Rade Šerbedžija as Chiron
 Johnathon Schaech as Tarak
 Luke Newberry as Agamemnon
 Jukka Hildén as Creon
 Kenneth Cranham as Lucius
 Mariah Gale as Kakia
 Sarai Givaty as Saphirra
 Dimiter Doichinov as King Galenus 
 Richard Reid as Archer #1
 Spencer Wilding as Humbaba
 Bashar Rahal as Battalion Commander #1

Reception

Critical response
The Legend of Hercules received critically negative reviews from critics. On Rotten Tomatoes, the film has an approval rating of 5% based on 83 reviews, with an average rating of 2.70/10, based on 82 reviews. The site's consensus reads: "Cheap-looking, poorly acted, and dull, The Legend of Hercules is neither fun enough to qualify as an action movie nor absorbing enough to work on a dramatic level". On Metacritic, the film has a score of 22 out of 100, based on reviews from 19 critics, indicating "generally unfavorable reviews". Audiences polled by CinemaScore gave the film an average grade of "B−" on an A+ to F scale.

Box office
The Legend of Hercules grossed $8,868,318 in its opening weekend, ranking #3 in the domestic box office behind Lone Survivor and Frozen. As of March 9, 2014, the film has grossed $18.8 million domestically and an additional $42.4 million internationally for a worldwide total of $61.3 million, failing to make back the budget of $70 million.

Accolades

See also
 List of films featuring Hercules

References

External links
 
 
 
 
 

2014 films
2014 3D films
2010s action adventure films
2010s fantasy adventure films
American action adventure films
American fantasy adventure films
2010s English-language films
Films directed by Renny Harlin
Films about Heracles
Films set in the 12th century BC
Films set in Greece
Films about gladiatorial combat
Films shot in Bulgaria
Lionsgate films
Summit Entertainment films
Entertainment One films
Films scored by Tuomas Kantelinen
Films with screenplays by Sean Hood
Films produced by Boaz Davidson
2010s American films